Hussein Mohamed Bashe (born 26 August 1975)  is a Tanzanian CCM politician and Member of Parliament for Nzega Urban constituency since 2015. In January 2022, he was appointed Agriculture Minister.

References

1975 births
Living people
People from Nzega District
Chama Cha Mapinduzi MPs
Tanzanian MPs 2015–2020
Tanzanian MPs 2020–2025